Weber Thompson is an architecture firm based in Seattle, Washington. The firm employs over 70 architects and primarily focuses on high-rise buildings, interior design, and landscape architecture, also specializing in commercial office space, affordable housing and sustainable design. 17 of the firm's projects have earned LEED certification.

History

The firm was founded by Scott Thompson, Blaine Weber, and Jeffrey Hamlett in 1987 as Weber Thompson Hamlett Architects. Thompson and Weber had met in Hawaii, sharing an interest in surfing, and graduated from the architecture program together at the University of Hawaii. Hamlett, who was also an attorney, later moved away from the company to establish a law practice for architectural contracts. Kristen Scott became the firm's third principal in 1996, three years after joining the firm as an associate.

In April 2008, Weber Thompson moved its headquarters to The Terry Thomas Building in Seattle's South Lake Union neighborhood; the building, designed in-house by the firm, is LEED Platinum certified and was planned with sustainable design features.

During the late-2000s recession, the number of employees at Weber Thompson dropped from 94 in early 2007 to 54 by late 2008, following similar trends that affected other architecture firms in the region.

Scott Thompson retired in 2015, and was replaced by new promoted partners, Amanda Keating AIA, LEED AP BD+C, Jeff Reibman AIA, LEED AP BD+C, and Elizabeth Holland MBA, LEED AP.

Notable projects

Completed high-rise buildings
Nexus (completed 2020)
Arrivé (formerly Cinema Tower and Potala Tower; completed 2019)
Kiara (completed 2018)
Stratus (completed 2018)
Helios (completed 2017)
LUMA (completed 2016)
Cirrus (completed 2015)
Premiere on Pine (completed 2014)
Fifteen Twenty-One Second Avenue (completed 2008)

Other competed projects
Raven Terrace at Yesler Terrace (Part of the redevelopment with Seattle Housing Authority) (completed 2016)
The Terry Thomas Building (completed 2008)

Under construction, planned or proposed projects
8th & Pine

Awards and recognition

Weber Thompson was named one of the top 100 U.S. firms designing residential projects in 2015 by Interior Design magazine.

Weber Thompson ranks 16th in the 2016 Building Design + Construction's Top 110 Multifamily Architects List.

Weber Thompson has been listed in the 2016 PSMJ Circle of Excellence, earning the firm a Platinum Award.

Weber Thompson listed among Architect Magazine's 2016 Top 50 firms in the nation.

References

External links

1987 establishments in the United States
Architecture firms based in Washington (state)
Companies based in Seattle
Companies established in 1987